Ferencvárosi Torna Club, known as Ferencváros, Fradi, or simply FTC, is a professional football club based in Ferencváros, Budapest, Hungary, that competes in the Nemzeti Bajnokság I, the top flight of Hungarian football. Ferencváros was founded in 1899 by Ferenc Springer and a group of local residents of Budapest's ninth district, Ferencváros. Ferencváros is best known internationally for winning the 1964–65 edition of the Inter-Cities Fairs Cup after defeating Juventus 1–0 in Turin in the final. Ferencváros also reached the final in the same competition in 1968, when they lost to Leeds United, as well as the final in the 1974–75 season of the European Cup Winners' Cup, losing to Dynamo Kyiv.

The best-known part of the club is the well-supported men's football team – the most popular team in the country. The parent multisport club Ferencvárosi TC divisions include women's football, women's handball, men's futsal, men's ice hockey, men's handball, men's water polo, cycling, gymnastics, athletics, wrestling, curling and swimming teams, some of which are highly successful.

The club colours are green and white, and the club's mascot is a green eagle, hence another of the club's nicknames, The Green Eagles.

History

On 3 May 1899, Ferencvárosi TC was founded by citizens of the 9th district of Budapest. Ferencváros have played in the Nemzeti Bajnokság I since its inception in 1901, except for three seasons between 2006 and 2009. The club had financial problems therefore in 2006 the Hungarian Football Federation (MLSZ) withdrew the club's licence but this withdrawal was eventual deemed unauthorized. Following this, Fradi were promoted back to the first division in 2009.

Ferencváros are the most successful Hungarian team both domestically and internationally. They won the 1964–65 Inter-Cities Fairs Cup and have also won the Nemzeti Bajnokság I 33 times and the Magyar Kupa 24 times.

They qualified for the renewed Champions League, the first Hungarian Club to do so, in the 1995–1996 season. Since then, the club have also taken part in the 2004–05 UEFA Cup, 2019–20 Europa League, 2020–21 Champions League, and 2021–22 Europa League group stages.

Crest and colours
The colours of the club are green and white.

Naming history
Ferencvárosi TC has changed names various times throughout their history:
1899–1950: Ferencvárosi Torna Club
1950–1951: ÉDOSZ SE
1951–1956: Kinizsi
1956–present: Ferencvárosi Torna Club

Kit suppliers and shirt sponsors
The following table shows in detail Ferencvárosi TC kit manufacturers and shirt sponsors by year:

Current sponsorships:
Official Sport Clothing Manufacturer: Nike
Main Diamond Sponsor: Groupama Garancia Insurance
Diamond ranked sponsors: Fővárosi Csatornázási Művek, Szerencsejáték Zrt.
Exclusive Partners: Provident, Budapest Gas Works Co., SEAT, Market Építőipari Zrt.
Fradi Business Club members: Dover, BTel, Auguszt Confectionery, Endo Service, Raditech, HungestHotel, San Benedetto, GDF Suez, 'Nem adom fel' Foundation

Stadium

The first stadium of the club started being built in the autumn of 1910. On 12 February 1911, Ferencváros played their first match against Budapest rival MTK Budapest which was won by the club. The starting line-up consisted of Fritz, Rumbold, Magnlitz, Weinber, Bródy, Payer, Szeitler, Weisz, Koródy, Schlosser, Borbás. The first stadium could host 40,000 spectators.

In 1971 the stands were demolished and a new stadium began to be built. The new stadium was inaugurated on the 75th anniversary of the club. On 19 May 1974, the first match was played against Vasas. The new stadium could host 29,505 spectators (including 10,771 seats and 18,734 standing). In the 1990s the stadium was redesigned to meet the UEFA requirements therefore its capacity was reduced to 18,100. When Ferencváros qualified for the 1995–96 UEFA Champions League group stage, a new journalist stand was built over the main stand.

On 21 December 2007, the stadium's name was changed from Üllői úti Stadion to Stadion Albert Flórián. Flórián Albert, the former Ferencváros icon, was present at the inauguration ceremony.
There were many plans on how to increase the capacity of the stadium in case the Hungarian Football Federation won the bid for the UEFA Euro 2008 or the Euro 2012. However, the Federation did not win any bids therefore the reconstruction of the stadium was delayed.

When Kevin McCabe became the owner of the club the reconstruction was on schedule again. Later, McCabe sold his team to the Hungarian state and the reconstruction did not take place.

Ferencváros Stadion, multi-purpose stadium, is the third home of the club. It has a capacity of 20,000 spectators in UEFA matches and 23,700 in Hungarian League matches.

When Gábor Kubatov was elected as president of the club, he and Pál Orosz managed to raise enough funds for the construction of a new stadium. The new stadium was rotated by 90 degrees in order to meet UEFA requirements. Therefore, the main stand which was parallel to the Üllői út became parallel to the Hungária körút. As part of the national stadium reconstruction programme the new stadium was built between 2013 and 2014.

The stadium was designed by Ágnes Streit and Szabolcs Kormos and was built by Market Építő Zrt from 2013 to 2014. In the arena there can be found the Ferencváros Museum and a fan shop too. The stadium is cutting edge in its vein matching entrance system. On 10 August 2014, Ferencváros played the opening match against Chelsea.

After the demolition of the Puskás Ferenc Stadion, Hungary played their home matches at the new arena until the new Puskás Ferenc Stadion was opened in late 2019. The national team celebrated the victory against Norway after a 2–1 win at the UEFA Euro 2016 qualifying play-off.

Ownership
On 14 February 2008, Sheffield United public limited company chairman Kevin McCabe successfully acquired a tender to purchase Ferencváros. McCabe's Hungarian company, Esplanade Limited liability company bought Ferencváros' real estate for £8.45 million with a view to start paying off the £5 million debt. In April 2008, Ferencváros Torna Club officially agreed to sell the football club, Ferencváros Labdarúgó ZRt. to Esplanade Kft., McCabe's company in Hungary.

In 2011, McCabe relinquished his ownership of the club after describing a "strained relationship" with some minority shareholders.

On 25 February 2011, Gábor Kubatov, Hungarian MP, was appointed as the president of Ferencváros.

On 28 October 2014, Gábor Kubatov was re-elected to serve another four-year term as the president of the club.

Supporters and rivalries

Supporters of Ferencváros are mainly from the capital city of Hungary, Budapest. However, the club is popular all over Hungary.

Since the opening of the newly built Groupama Aréna, the spectators are scanned at the entrance. As a consequence, the main supporter group of the club, called B-közép, announced a boycott in 2014. Club chairman Kubatov said that he had wanted peace in the new stadium and the club had already paid a lot of fines and punishments due to the unacceptable behaviour of the B-közép. Kubatov had expected that the spectators could have been changed due to the new regulations. However, the number of spectators had not increased in the 2014–15 and 2015–16 seasons.

On 13 March 2016, 10,125 spectators watched the match between Ferencváros' second team against Csepel SC in the 2015–16 Nemzeti Bajnokság III season. The match was a protest by the B-közép to show how many spectators were missing from the Groupama Aréna.

On 24 March 2016, the representatives of the B-közép started negotiations with club leader, Gabor Kubatov. As a results of negotiations they were allowed back to the stadium.

Friendships
The fans have friendships with fans of Rapid Wien and Panathinaikos, and as all three play in Green the alliance is nicknamed the "Green Brothers". They also have friendly relations in Hungary with fans of Zalaegerszeg and in Poland with Śląsk Wrocław and Bałtyk Gdynia.

Rivalries

Ferencváros have rivalry with several teams from Budapest including MTK Budapest, Újpest, Honvéd, Vasas SC, and several provincial clubs such as Debrecen and Diósgyőr. Since Ferencváros has been the most successful club in Hungarian Football history by winning 33 Hungarian League titles, 21 Hungarian Cup titles and 2 Hungarian League Cup titles and the most successful Hungarian club in the European football competitions by winning the Inter-Cities Fairs Cup 1964–65 season every club in the Hungarian League wants to defeat them.

The biggest rivalry is with Újpest, which dates back to the 1930s when Újpest won their first Hungarian League title. Since then, the fixture between the two teams attracts the most spectators in the domestic league. The matches between the two teams often end in violence which causes big trouble for the Hungarian football. The proposal of personal registration was refused by both clubs.

The fixture between Ferencváros and MTK Budapest FC is called the Örökrangadó or Eternal derby. It is the oldest football rivalry in Hungary, which dates back as early as the 1903 season when Ferencváros first won the Hungarian League. In the following three decades either Ferencváros or MTK Budapest won the domestic league.

Honvéd are also considered fierce rivals as the clubs are in very close proximity to each other and in the past frequently competed for honours.

Hooliganism

On 26 November 2002, the UEFA Control and Disciplinary Committee fined Ferencváros €18,300 for fireworks and hooliganism-related offences committed by the fans of Ferencváros before and after the 2002-03 UEFA Cup second tie against VfB Stuttgart on 12 November 2002.
	
In 2004, Ferencváros were charged by UEFA with crowd trouble and racist abuse after playing Millwall in the 2004-05 UEFA Cup tie in Budapest, Hungary. Four fans of Millwall suffered stab wounds. The racist abuse was directed at Millwall's players of African origin, including Paul Ifill.
	
On 17 July 2013, Ferencváros fans fought with police after a friendly match against Leeds United, which ended in a 1–0 victory over the Championship club, in Murska Sobota, Slovenia.

On 19 July 2014, UEFA issued sanctions against Ferencváros and Diósgyőr and Slovakia’s Spartak Trnava, following racist behaviour by their fans during 2014–15 UEFA Europa League qualifying matches against Maltese sides Sliema Wanderers, Birkirkara and Hibernians respectively. Ferencvaros were the hardest hit by the UEFA measures as club were fined by €20,000 and the partial closure of their stadium following monkey chants and racist banners displayed in both legs in Malta and Hungary.

On 27 January 2015, Gábor Kubatov, president of the club, said that he would have the fines paid by the supporters. Kubatov aims to cease the racism and violence at the stadium.

On 9 February 2015, UEFA refused the appeal of Ferencváros in connection with the incidents before and after the 2014–15 UEFA Europa League qualifying match between NK Rijeka and Ferencváros. According to the verdict, Ferencváros supporters were not allowed to attend the following UEFA match at home.

Honours

Domestic
Nemzeti Bajnokság I
Winners (33): 12: 1903, 1905, 1906–07, 1908–09, 1909–10, 1910–11, 1911–12, 1912–13, 1925–26, 1926–27, 1927–28, 1931–32, 1933–34, 1937–38, 1939–40, 1940–41, 1948–49, 1962–63, 1964, 1967, 1968, 1975–76, 1980–81, 1991–92, 1994–95, 1995–96, 2000–01, 2003–04, 2015–16, 2018–19, 2019–20, 2020–21, 2021–22
 Runners-up (36): 1902, 1904, 1907–08, 1913–14, 1917–18, 1918–19, 1921–22, 1923–24, 1924–25, 1928–29, 1929–30, 1934–35, 1936–37, 1938–39, 1943–44, 1945, 1949-50, 1959–60, 1965, 1966, 1970, 1970–71, 1972–73, 1973–74, 1978–79, 1981–82, 1982–83, 1988–89, 1990–91, 1997–98, 1998–99, 2001–02, 2002–03, 2004–05, 2014–15, 2017–18
Nemzeti Bajnokság II
 Winners (1): 2008–09
 Runners-up (1): 2006–07
Magyar Kupa
 Winners (24): 13: 1912–13, 1921–22, 1926–27, 1927–28, 1932–33, 1934–35, 1941–42, 1942–43, 1943–44, 1955–58, 1971–72, 1973–74, 1975–76, 1977–78, 1990–91, 1992–93, 1993–94, 1994–95, 2002–03, 2003–04, 2014–15, 2015–16, 2016–17, 2021–22
Szuperkupa
 Winners (6): 1993, 1994, 1995, 2004, 2015, 2016
Ligakupa
 Winners (2): 2012–13, 2014–15

European

Inter-Cities Fairs Cup
 Winners (1): 1964–65
Runners-up (1): 1967–68
UEFA Cup Winners' Cup
Runners-up (1): 1974–75
Mitropa Cup
 Winners (2): 1928, 1937
Runners-up (4): 1935, 1938, 1939, 1940
Challenge Cup
Winners (1): 1909
Runners-up (1): 1911

Notes
Note 12: more than any other Hungarian football club.
Note 13: more than any other Hungarian football club.

Individual awards

Domestic

Hungarian First League top scorers

Hungarian Second League top scorers

International

Ballon d'Or
  Flórián Albert (1967)

FIFA World Cup Golden Shoe
  Flórián Albert (1962)

FIFA World Cup All-star Team
  Flórián Albert (1966)

FIFA World Cup Best Young Player Award
  Flórián Albert (1962)

European Championship Golden Boot
  Dezső Novák (1964)

European Championship Team of the Tournament
  Flórián Albert (1964)
  Dezső Novák (1964)

Club records

Top 10 most appearances of all-time

Top 10 scorers of all-time

Players

Current squad

Out on loan

Feeder club
  Soroksár (NB II)

Retired numbers

 2 –  Tibor Simon, Defender (1985–99) – posthumous honour.
 12 –  "The 12th man", reserved for club supporters. Number retired in 2007.

Notable former players
Had senior international caps for their respective countries.
Players whose name is listed in bold represented their countries while playing for Ferencváros.

 Akeem Adams 11
 Flórián Albert 4 5
 Flórián Albert Jr.
 Aleksandar Bajevski
 László Bálint 6
 Zoltán Balogh
 Zsolt Bárányos
 Matthew Bartholomew
 Muhamed Bešić 10
 Mihály Bíró 2
 Dániel Böde
 Elemér Berkessy
 Zoltán Blum
 Gáspár Borbás
 Predrag Bošnjak
 Sándor Bródy
 László Budai
 Márton Bukovi
 Ákos Buzsáky
 Zoltán Bükszegi
 Csaba Csizmadia
 László Czéh
 Zoltán Czibor
 Jenő Dalnoki
 Ferenc Deák
 Lajos Détári
 Tommy Doherty
 Attila Dragóner
 József Eisenhoffer
 Márton Esterházy
 Tibor Fábián
 Teslim Fatusi
 Gyula Feldmann
 Máté Fenyvesi 3 4 5
 István Ferenczi
 Pál Fischer
 Zoltán Friedmanszky 3
 Ákos Füzi
 Emil Gabrovitz
 Zoltán Gera
 Ádám Nagy
 István Géczi 5
 József Gregor
 Gyula Grosics
 Gábor Gyepes
 László Gyetvai
 Gábor Gyömbér
 Justin Haber
 József Háda 1 2
 Attila Hajdu
 Tamás Hajnal
 Juha Hakola
 Ferenc Hámori
 Marek Heinz
 Ferenc Horváth
 György Horváth
 János Hrutka
 Szabolcs Huszti
 Aleksandar Jović
 István Juhász
 Géza Kalocsay
 Adem Kapič
 Tibor Kemény 1
 András Keresztúri
 Géza Kertész
 Béla Kiss
 Martin Klein
 Sándor Kocsis
 Lajos Korányi 2
 Béla Kovács
 János Kovács
 Attila Kriston
   László Kubala
 Lajos Kű
 Zsolt Laczkó
 Károly Lakat
 Benjamin Lauth
 Gyula Lázár 1 2
 Leandro
 Miklós Lendvai
 Zsolt Limperger
 Péter Lipcsei
 Krisztián Lisztes
 Antal Lyka
 István Magyar
 Róbert Mak
 Gyula Mándi
 Sándor Mátrai 3 4 5
 Győző Martos 6
 János Máté
 János Mátyus
 József Mészáros
  Vasile Miriuță
 Jason Morrison
 Sándor Nemes
 Dezső Novák
 Elek Nyilas
 Tibor Nyilasi 6 7
 Gábor Obitz
 József Pálinkás
 Miklós Páncsics
 Mihály Pataki
  Attila Pinte
 Attila Pintér
 Gyula Polgár 1 2
 Gábor Pölöskei 7
 László Pusztai 6
  Vasyl Rats 8 9
 Tibor Rab 6 7
 Gyula Rákosi 4 5
 László Répási
 István Rodenbücher
 Dénes Rósa
 Gyula Rumbold
 József Sándor
 Béla Sárosi 2
 György Sárosi 1 2
 André Schembri
 Imre Schlosser
 Ernő Schwarz
 Geza Šifliš
 Tibor Simon
 Vilmos Sipos
 Illés Zsolt Sitku
  Thomas Sowunmi
 Stefan Spirovski
 Imre Szabics
 Ferenc Szabó
 József Szabó
 László Szabó
 Ferenc Szedlacsek
 Tamás Szekeres
 István Szőke
 Lajos Szűcs
 Lajos Szűcs
 Ákos Takács
 József Takács
 Krisztián Timár
 Mihály Tóth
 István Tóth Potya
 Attila Tököli
 Géza Toldi 1 2
 Dániel Tőzsér
 József Turay
 Đorđe Tutorić
 Robert Vágner
 Zoltán Varga 5
 Zoltán Végh
 Gábor Vincze
 Ottó Vincze
 Dragan Vukmir
 Ferenc Weisz
 Jan-Michael Williams
 Rafe Wolfe
 Wolry Wolfe
 László Wukovics
 Gábor Zavadszky
 Zalán Zombori

Notes

Note 1: played at the 1934 FIFA World Cup.
Note 2: played at the 1938 FIFA World Cup.
Note 3: played at the 1958 FIFA World Cup.
Note 4: played at the 1962 FIFA World Cup.
Note 5: played at the 1966 FIFA World Cup.
Note 6: played at the 1978 FIFA World Cup.
Note 7: played at the 1982 FIFA World Cup.
Note 8: played at the 1986 FIFA World Cup.
Note 9: played at the 1990 FIFA World Cup.
Note 10: played at the 2014 FIFA World Cup.
Note 11: suffered heart attack after Ferencvárosi TC–Újpest FC derby on 27 September 2013 and died 30 December 2013. m

Non-playing staff

Board of directors

Board of Supervision

Coaches

First team

Second team

Former managers

Managers from 2010:

Former president

See also
History of Ferencvárosi TC
List of Ferencvárosi TC seasons
Ferencvárosi TC in European football
List of Ferencvárosi TC managers
List of Ferencvárosi TC records and statistics

Notes

References

External links

 
Ferencváros Ultras: photos and videos 
Fans of Ferencváros – Videoblog
Ultra Group Site 
Ferencváros Statistics Site 
ex-FTC Support Group Association 
Soccerway profile

 
Association football clubs established in 1899
Football clubs in Budapest
1899 establishments in Hungary
Inter-Cities Fairs Cup winning clubs